Apii Nicholls-Pualau (born 26 February 1993) is a New Zealand rugby league and union player. She played for the Gold Coast Titans in the NRL Women's Premiership.

In 2023, She was signed by Chiefs Manawa for the Super Rugby Aupiki competition.

Background
Born in Rarotonga, Nicolls-Paualau represented the Cook Islands rugby sevens team before switching to rugby league.

Playing career
In 2017, Nicholls-Paulau began playing for the Otahuhu Leopards in the Auckland Rugby League. Later that year, she was selected to represent New Zealand at the 2017 Women's Rugby League World Cup. She captained the team in a 50–4 win over Canada.

On 11 February 2018, she was named the NZRL Women's Player of the Year. On 1 August 2018, she joined the New Zealand Warriors NRL Women's Premiership team. In Round 1 of the 2018 NRL Women's season, she made her debut for the Warriors, kicking a goal in a 10–4 win over the Sydney Roosters.

In October 2019, Nicholls-Pualau was a member of New Zealand's 2019 Rugby League World Cup 9s-winning squad.

In October 2022 she was selected for the New Zealand squad at the delayed 2021 Women's Rugby League World Cup in England.

Rugby union 
Nicholls-Pualau was signed by Chiefs Manawa for the 2023 Super Rugby Aupiki season.

References

External links
NRL profile

1993 births
Living people
New Zealand female rugby league players
New Zealand women's national rugby league team players
New Zealand Warriors (NRLW) players
Rugby league fullbacks